Johan Tarčulovski (born 17 November 1974), is a Macedonian soldier, politician, war criminal and former security inspector for Macedonian President Boris Trajkovski. Tarčulovski participated in the 1990s insurgency in the Republic of Macedonia.

Career
Tarčulovski's political career began after the independence of the Republic of Macedonia in 1991, and he was one of the early members of the Internal Macedonian Revolutionary Organization – Democratic Party for Macedonian National Unity. In 1993, he was named president of the Cair Municipality Youth Force Union.

With the victory of VMRO-DPMNE in the 1998 elections, Tarculovski joined the security crew for the Prime Minister of the Republic of Macedonia Ljubco Georgievski. In 1999, he was appointed as bodyguard of the President of Macedonia. He remained as his bodyguard until Trajkovski's death in  a plane crash.

In 2001, he participated in the Macedonian-Albanian Conflict. The events of the war had severe consequences for Tarčulovski. He was brought before the international court in The Hague, convicted and sentenced to 12 years in prison. He stayed in jail from 21 March 2005 to 11 April 2013, when he was released from a German prison.

War criminal
Tarčulovski was convicted and sentenced by the Hague prosecution for war crimes on 12 August 2001 in Ljuboten. After spending eight years in prison he returned to his homeland where he was greeted as a "war hero" and he was welcomed by thousands of people on the Macedonia Square, Skopje."

Personal life

Tarčulovski was born in Butel Municipality on 17 November 1974. He and his wife, Sonja (née Veličkova), a Macedonian folk singer, have two children.

References

1974 births
Living people
Military personnel from Skopje
2001 insurgency in Macedonia
Politicians from Skopje
Army of North Macedonia personnel
People indicted by the International Criminal Tribunal for the former Yugoslavia
People convicted by the International Criminal Tribunal for the former Yugoslavia
Macedonian nationalists
People convicted of war crimes